The 1917 Washington & Jefferson Red and Black football team represented Washington & Jefferson College as an independent during the 1917 college football season. Led by Sol Metzger in his second and final year as head coach, Washington & Jefferson compiled a record of 7–3.

Schedule

References

Washington and Jefferson
Washington & Jefferson Presidents football seasons
Washington and Jefferson Red and Black football